Journal of Law & Technology may refer to:

Harvard Journal of Law & Technology
North Carolina Journal of Law & Technology